Saint Waltrude Collegiate Church is a Catholic parish church in Belgium, named in honour of Saint Waltrude of Mons. The church is a notable example of Gothic architecture, and is protected by the heritage register of Wallonia.

History 
The history of the church dates back to 1450, when construction of the east end began. It was built for a female religious community as a collegiate church. Its chapter of canonesses remained in existence until the revolutionary period at the end of the 18th century. 
The canonesses were typically members of aristocratic houses. Originally it was possible to admit the daughters of chevaliers. The statutes, as approved by the Empress, were made stricter in the 18th century as regards the requirement for the canonesses to prove their noble status.

Afterwards the building became a parish church.

Famous Canonesses 

 Isabel, sister of Katherine Swynford
 Eléonore-Jeanne de Mérode
 Marie-Magdelaine de Gavre
 Anne de Noyelles
 Anne Charlotte de Lorraine, Secular Abbess of the chapter in 1754 by imperial request of Empress Maria-Theresia

Architecture 

The exterior of the church is a fine example of Brabantine Gothic architecture, parts are built by Matheus de Layens. However, in the 17th century the works stopped and the building was never completely finished.

Interior 
The interior contains important artworks, including sculptures by Jacques du Broeucq and paintings by Peter Paul Rubens, Floris de Vriendt, Theodoor van Thulden, Otto Venius and Michiel Coxie.

Inside the church important graves can be found amongst them Antoine de Carondelet and Alice of Namur

Organ 
The church's original instrument was lost and at the beginning of the 19th century the present one was acquired. It originally belonged to an abbey and dates from the late 17th century. Both the old and the current organs were associated with the Fetis family. Antoine-Joseph Fetis was titular organist in the 18th century. He taught his eldest son François-Joseph Fétis, a famous Belgian musician, who showed talent as an organist from a young age.

A large instrument, capable of a wide range of repertoire, the St Waltrude organ was the subject of a major restoration at the beginning of the 21st century involving Klais Orgelbau.

References

External links 
Official website

Protected heritage sites in Hainaut (province)
History of Mons
Former collegiate churches in Belgium